Chah Tarakh or Chah-e Tarakh may refer to:
 Chah Tarakh-e Olya